Barbara Alvarez SCU  www.barbaraalvarez.net

Born January the 3rd, 1970 in Montevideo, Uruguay. From 1988 to 1991 pursued the career of Communication Sciences at the Catholic University of Uruguay. During the same period  also attended courses of appreciation of photography, press photography and Introduction to Filmmaking. In 1991 began to work as a camera assistant for several Production Companies in Montevideo. In 1997 attended the course of Cinematography II at the International Film and Television School of San Antonio de los Baños EICTV, Cuba, given by Raúl Rodriguez DP.

From 1995 worked as a Director of Photography in tv spots, music videos, documentaries, short and feature films. Some of these works were made in Uruguay, Argentina, Brazil, Chile, Colombia, Bolivia, Venezuela, Mexico, Peru, Haiti, and Denmark.

Member of the Academy of Motion Picture Arts and Sciences (AMPAS) since 2016.

Filmography

- 25 watts, 2001

- Whisky, 2004

- El Custodio, 2006

- The Headless Woman, 2008

- From Thursday til Sunday, 2012

- Dog Flesh, 2012

- The Second Mother, 2015

- Don’t Call Me Son, 2016

- Jesús, 2016

- The Fever, 2019

- El Prófugo, 2020

- Utama, 2022

External links
 
 https://www.barbaraalvarez.net/

Uruguayan cinematographers
Uruguayan women cinematographers
Argentine women cinematographers
Living people
1970 births
People from Montevideo
Uruguayan emigrants to Argentina